Digistain is a Harvard backed medical technology registered and cleared with the UK’s Medicines and Health Regulatory Agency that provides oncologists with decision support data to guide therapy decisions in cancer patients cost effectively with an accelerated turnaround time of under an hour. Comparable diagnostics delay treatment decisions by several weeks and are cost prohibitive limiting their clinical value especially in the community setting due to accessibility. Initial validation of Digistain has been achieved with early stage hormone positive breast breast cancer. The technology is used widely by oncologists to support the decision to administer or not to administer chemotherapy in early stage patients.

Digistain uses mid infrared spectroscopy to detect and measure chemical moieties whose concentrations are known to correlate with tumour malignancy. By performing such measurements on tumour tissue where genomic expression has already manifested morphologically Digistain’s measurements avoid the inherent challenges that exist in genomic measurement of formalin fixed tissue samples driven by variations in tissue fixation time.

The Digistain research was funded by the National Institute of Health Research, Imperial College NHS Trust and also the Royal Society. The technology was spun out of Imperial College in 2021 as a commercial venture and received initial investment from Y Combinator and Harvard among other Silicon Valley tech investors.

History 
The Digistain technology was created at the Imperial College Physics Department by Hemmel Amrania and Chris Phillips. The concept underpinning the technology was proposed by Nicholas Wright, Head of Pathology at Cancer Research UK and William Otto in order to eliminate non concordance in histological grading. Examples of histological grading inadequacies include the Nottingham Grading system for breast cancer where the non-concordance of histological grading is chiefly responsible for the overtreatment of breast cancer with cytotoxic therapy.

Amrania and Phillips devised a method to objectively assess tumour grade using spectroscopic measurements that are reagent free and simple to perform and in the case of breast tumours translated this measure into an evaluation of patient risk to deliver clinical utility and treatment decision support for oncologists.

It was later validated in over 800 patients by Ian Ellis - past president of the international society of breast pathology and joint founder of the Elston-Ellis modification of the Bloom-Richardson grading system for breast tumours. Prof Emad Rakha and Prof Andrew Green of Nottingham University Hospital also led the study.

Digistain has been trialled with leading British cancer treatment centres including Imperial College Healthcare, Nottingham University Hospitals NHS Trust, and Barts Cancer Institute at Queen’s Mary University London.

Awards 

 In 2017, President’s Award for Outstanding Research at Imperial College.
 In 2018, Royal Society Innovation Award.
 In November 2022, Institute of Physics award for the novel application of spectroscopy to eliminate healthcare inequalities globally.
 In January 2023, the Innovate UK SMART award by the UK Government to help reduce cancer waiting times and  in the same month  was shortlisted as a finalist in the Medilink Heatlhcare Business Awards for successful export of British technology and advances in digital healthcare.

References

External links 

 Official Website

Companies of England
Technology companies of England
Health care companies of England
Cancer treatments